Nosakhare Model Education Centre, is a co-education centre, located in Benin City, Edo State, Nigeria, founded in 1996 by Deacon (Ambassador) Daniel Nosakhare Eghobamien.

The centre is designed to concurrently offer learning through small group methods for learners in the afternoon sessions from the Nursery to Secondary levels of learning and through pure Montessori method in the Nursery and Primary Schools.

The school

History 
The establishment of the Model Educational Centre was by Deacon Daniel Nosakhare Eghobamien. Originally, it was not the intention of Deacon (Ambassador) Daniel Nosakhare Eghobamien to establish a school on purchase of the landed property, where he started the erection of a huge multi-purpose building along Upper Mission road in New Benin, Benin City.
The Educational Centre’s first set of mixed intake (boys and girls) into the Nursery, Primary and Secondary Schools was in September 1996 and ever since the enrolment, figures have grown yearly, with locally and foreign trained teachers on hand.

It has training and hostel facilities for local and international (foreign) pupils and students.

Administration 
 	Mrs. M. O. Omobude: Executive Director
 	Barr. (Mrs.) Uyi N. Uhunamure: Registrar
 	Mrs. A. Okoro: Chief Matron
 	Mrs. R. Ezire:	Property/Personnel Manager

References

Schools in Nigeria
Educational institutions established in 1996
1996 establishments in Nigeria
Education in Benin City